Matthew Todd Steigenga (born March 27, 1970) is a retired American professional basketball player.  He was a 6'7", 220-40 lbs. power forward who most notably played a part of one season with the Chicago Bulls and a season in the Liga ACB.

Early life
Born in Grand Rapids, Michigan, Steigenga showed athletic ability at an early age, winning the National Football League's Punt, Pass, and Kick for youths at age nine.

Basketball career
As a high schooler, Steigenga had starred for South Christian High School, leading them to the 1988 Michigan Class B title while being named Mr. Basketball of Michigan. In the year's McDonald's All American All-star game, Steigenga won the slam dunk contest.

As a collegian, Steigenga started his final three years at Michigan State University, averaging 10.5 points and 4.3 rebounds per game in his four years. He finished the Spartans 11th all-time leading scorer and currently stands 17th with 1296 career points, and was also the school's leading career shot blocker with 97 until 2008, when Drew Naymick surpassed this total.  The Jud Heathcote-coached Spartans in 1990 won Big Ten championship and reached the NCAA tournament sweet 16.

A second round pick of the Chicago Bulls in the 1992 NBA draft (52nd overall), Steigenga was signed late in the 1996-97 season when the Bulls needed to fill an injury-depleted roster. He appeared in two games playing a total of 12 minutes and scoring three points. Athletic, he scored his only field goal on an alley oop dunk, against the Toronto Raptors at the United Center.

Steigenga would again sign with the Bulls in January 1999, but was put on waivers a few weeks later, without appearing in any games. Despite playing so little, Steigenga was awarded an NBA championship ring as the Bulls, led by Michael Jordan and Scottie Pippen, won the 1997 NBA Championship.

Additionally, Steigenga played the 1995-96 pre-season with the Atlanta Hawks, but failed to make the regular season roster. From 1992 to 2000, the Bulls notwithstanding, he represented the CBA's Grand Rapids Hoops (1992–93), Rochester Renegade (1993), Quad City Thunder (1996–98) and Rockford Lightning (1998–2000), also playing abroad in Spain (Taugrés, 1993) and Japan (Mitsubishi Electric Melco Dolphins, 1995–96).

At the international level, Steigenga was on the silver-medalist 1999 Pan American Games US team. He was also a member of NBA Ambassador teams who played in league championships in South America during the summer of 1999, and China the following summer.

External links
NBA.com profile
Stats at DatabaseBasketball
Basketpedya career data

1970 births
Living people
American expatriate basketball people in Japan
American expatriate basketball people in Spain
American men's basketball players
American people of Dutch descent
Basketball players at the 1999 Pan American Games
Basketball players from Grand Rapids, Michigan
Chicago Bulls draft picks
Chicago Bulls players
Grand Rapids Hoops players
Liga ACB players
McDonald's High School All-Americans
Medalists at the 1999 Pan American Games
Michigan State Spartans men's basketball players
Nagoya Diamond Dolphins players
Pan American Games medalists in basketball
Pan American Games silver medalists for the United States
Parade High School All-Americans (boys' basketball)
Quad City Thunder players
Rochester Renegade players
Saski Baskonia players
Small forwards